The NBA All-Rookie Team is an annual National Basketball Association (NBA) honor given since the 1962–63 NBA season to the top rookies during the regular season. Voting is conducted by the NBA head coaches who are not allowed to vote for players on their own team. The All-Rookie Team is generally composed of two five-man lineups: a first team and a second team. The players each receive two points for each first team vote and one point for each second team vote. The top five players with the highest point total make the first team, with the next five making the second team. In the case of a tie at the fifth position of either team, the roster is expanded. If the first team consists of six players due to a tie, the second team will still consist of five players with the potential for more expansion in the event of additional ties. Ties have occurred several times, most recently in 2012, when Kawhi Leonard, Iman Shumpert, and Brandon Knight tied in votes received. No respect is given to positions. For example, the first team had four forwards, and one guard in 2008, while the first team had four centers (two of which were forward-centers) and one guard in 2016.

The Chicago Bulls hold the record for franchise with the most All-Rookie Team selections, with 25. The New York Knicks are second, with the franchise having 22 players selected. Nine All-Rookie Team members have won both the Rookie of the Year Award and the Most Valuable Player Award (MVP) during their careers. Wilt Chamberlain and Wes Unseld are the only players to accomplish this feat in the same season.

Selections

See also

Notes

 Before the 1971–72 season, Lew Alcindor changed his name to Kareem Abdul-Jabbar.
 When Olajuwon arrived in the United States, the University of Houston incorrectly spelled his first name "Akeem". Olajuwon used that spelling until March 9, 1991, when he announced that he would add an H.
 Richard Dumas was originally drafted in 1991, but due to drug violations, he was suspended for the entire .
 Ron Artest changed his name to Metta World Peace on September 16, 2011 and later Metta Sandiford-Artest in May 2020.
 Amar'e Stoudemire's first name had previously been spelled incorrectly as "Amaré" or "Amare" since joining the NBA, but was changed to "Amar'e" in October 2008.
He underwent surgery in January 2010 and missed the entire season.
 Jonas Valančiūnas was drafted in 2011, but due partially to the 2011 NBA lockout, he spent the entire  in his home nation of Lithuania.
 Nenê Hilario changed his name to simply Nenê on August 6, 2003.
 Ben Simmons was drafted in 2016, but injured his right foot and was ruled out of the entire season.

References
General

Specific

All-Rookie Team
National Basketball Association lists
Awards established in 1963
Rookie player awards